Eric Butorac and Scott Lipsky defeated Colin Fleming and Ken Skupski in the final (6–4, 6–4).

Seeds

Draw

Draw

References
 Doubles Draw
 Qualifying Draw

Aegon Trophy - Doubles
2009 Doubles